The Colburn Park Historic District encompasses the heart of Lebanon, New Hampshire. It consists of Colburn Park, a large rectangular park in the center of the city, the buildings that are arrayed around it, and several 19th century buildings that are immediately adjacent to those.

Colburn Park is located a short way south and east of the Mascoma River, whose generally east–west route is interrupted by a semicircular bend to the north, within which lies the center of Lebanon.  The park's origin is in 1792, when the land was donated by Robert Colburn as the site of the community's meeting house (church and town hall). Arterial roads were built to the area, and it began to develop as a commercial and civic center in the early 19th century. The Greek Revival First Congregational Church, designed by Ammi Burnham Young, was built in 1828, and a few early houses survive. The meeting house was moved in 1849 to the present location of City Hall.

Lebanon's central business district was struck by devastating fire in 1887, in which more than 80 buildings were destroyed. This did not directly affect the area around the park, but Lebanon's population continued to grow, and the business district expanded, resulting in the relocation of houses around the park, and the construction of a number of Victorian buildings around its perimeter. After the 1923 destruction by fire of the town hall, the area acquired a somewhat unified late-19th to early-20th century commercial and civic architecture.

See also
National Register of Historic Places listings in Grafton County, New Hampshire

References

Historic districts on the National Register of Historic Places in New Hampshire
Queen Anne architecture in New Hampshire
Colonial Revival architecture in New Hampshire
Chicago school architecture in the United States
Historic districts in Grafton County, New Hampshire
National Register of Historic Places in Grafton County, New Hampshire
Lebanon, New Hampshire